Dan Werb is a Canadian epidemiologist and former musician.

Musical career
As a musician he is best known for his musical work with the dance punk band Woodhands, and his collaboration with Maylee Todd in the project Ark Analog. In 2011 he also participated in the National Parks Project, collaborating with musicians Sebastien Grainger and Jennifer Castle, and filmmaker Catherine Martin, to produce and score a short documentary film about Mingan Archipelago National Park Reserve in Quebec.

Scientific research
As an epidemiologist, he has been associated with the B.C. Centre for Excellence in HIV/AIDS, the International Centre for Science in Drug Policy and the School of Medicine at the University of California, San Diego. In 2015, he received a research grant for work in HIV/AIDS and drug addiction prevention.

In 2019, he published the book City of Omens: A Search for the Missing Women of the Borderlands, an examination of the complex factors threatening the safety of poor women in the Tijuana area of Mexico. The book was shortlisted for the Governor General's Award for English-language non-fiction at the 2019 Governor General's Awards. 

His 2022 book The Invisible Siege: The Rise of Coronaviruses and the Search for a Cure was the winner of the Hilary Weston Writers' Trust Prize for Nonfiction.

References

21st-century Canadian male musicians
21st-century Canadian non-fiction writers
21st-century Canadian male writers
Canadian male non-fiction writers
Canadian indie rock musicians
Canadian electronic musicians
Canadian epidemiologists
HIV/AIDS researchers
Living people
Year of birth missing (living people)